Burlington, Cedar Rapids & Northern Passenger Depot-Dows, also known as the Dows Rock Island Depot, is an historic building located in Dows, Iowa, United States.  The depot was built in 1896 and served the Burlington, Cedar Rapids and Northern Railway as a combination passenger and freight station.  The Romanesque Revival style was inspired by Henry Hobson Richardson's designs
for small railroad stations. It was the first railway depot in Wright County.  It passed to the Chicago, Rock Island and Pacific Railroad and continued to serve as a working depot until 1980. The Dows Historical Society bought and restored the depot in 1988.  It now serves as a welcome center and railroad museum. It was listed on the National Register of Historic Places in 1993.

References

Railway stations in the United States opened in 1896
Railway stations closed in 1980
1896 establishments in Iowa
1980 disestablishments in Iowa
Romanesque Revival architecture in Iowa
Transportation buildings and structures in Wright County, Iowa
Railway stations on the National Register of Historic Places in Iowa
Former railway stations in Iowa
Former Burlington, Cedar Rapids and Northern Railway stations
National Register of Historic Places in Wright County, Iowa